The Molo snake eel (Hemerorhinus heyningi) is an eel in the family Ophichthidae (worm/snake eels). It was described by Max Carl Wilhelm Weber in 1913. It is a marine, tropical eel which is known from Indonesia, in the Indo-Pacific.

References

Ophichthidae
Fish described in 1913